Rama Devi or Ramadevi may refer to:
 Rama Devi (Orissa politician) (1889–1985), female leader of the nationalists in Orissa
 Rama Devi (Bihar politician) (born 1965), politician from Bihar
 V. S. Ramadevi (1934–2013), Chief Election Commissioner of India and Governor of Himachal Pradesh
 Ramadevi Choudhury (1899–1985), Indian freedom fighter and social reformer

Indian given names